Alphousseyni Keita  (born 3 November 1985) is a Malian former professional footballer who played as a midfielder.

Club career 
Born in Bamako, Keita began his career by Cercle Olympique de Bamako, in January 2007 joined to Djoliba AC. After six months he left Djoliba and moved to French side Le Mans, where he played 8 games for the reserve and was promoted to first team in January 2008.

On 28 January 2009, the midfielder joined Nîmes Olympique on loan from Le Mans until the end of the season. One year later, on 7 January 2010, Nîmes signed him permanently until June 2012.

On 29 April 2012, while due to play a game for his new temporary team U.D. Leiria against Feirense, he was accused of running out of the dressing room with a money box containing approximately €6000, and vanished. Later the club stated that the accusation was false. The player agreed not to press charges against the club for defamation.

International career 
Keita played his first international game for Mali, on 3 September 2005 against Congo DR national football team.

References

External links 
 
 
 
 
 Foot Mali Profile

1985 births
Living people
Sportspeople from Bamako
Association football midfielders
Malian footballers
Mali international footballers
Malian expatriate footballers
Expatriate footballers in France
Expatriate footballers in Portugal
Malian expatriate sportspeople in France
Malian expatriate sportspeople in Portugal
Le Mans FC players
Nîmes Olympique players
Ligue 1 players
Djoliba AC players
Ligue 2 players
U.D. Leiria players
Associação Académica de Coimbra – O.A.F. players
Gil Vicente F.C. players
Primeira Liga players
CO de Bamako players
21st-century Malian people